Andrew Jordan (September 24, 1971 – June 4, 2022), better known as Skull Duggery, was an American rapper best known for his time spent with Master P's No Limit Records in the late 1990s.

Skull Duggery made his first appearance on No Limit's 1995 compilation, Down South Hustlers: Bouncin' and Swingin' on the song entitled "Darkside". About a year later, Master P released a trailer on Silkk the Shocker's first album The Shocker promoting  Duggery's debut album, and setting the album's release date for September 24, 1996, but the release was pushed back to a week later. Skull Duggery released Hoodlum Fo' Life on October 1, 1996, under the alias Skull Dugrey, but the album failed to sell well, only peaking at #29 on the Top R&B/Hip-Hop Albums and #8 on the Top Heatseekers. His next album, 1998's These Wicked Streets fared much better, making it to #21 on the Billboard 200 and #4 on the Top R&B/Hip-Hop Albums chart.

After leaving No Limit in 1999, Skull Duggery independently released 2000's 3rd Ward Stepper and 2003's Controversy.

Death
On June 4, 2022, Skull Duggery's death was announced by his niece Evangeline Squall. A cause of death was not revealed.

Discography

References

1971 births
2022 deaths
21st-century American rappers
21st-century American male musicians
African-American male rappers
American people convicted of child pornography offenses
Gangsta rappers
No Limit Records artists
Priority Records artists
Prisoners and detainees of Louisiana
Rappers from New Orleans
21st-century African-American musicians